Porto Cervo is an Italian seaside resort in northern Sardinia. It is a frazione of the comune of Arzachena, in the province of Sassari. Created by Prince Karim Aga Khan and various other investors, Porto Cervo is the main centre of Costa Smeralda. It has a resident population of 421 inhabitants. Porto Cervo has been named one of the most expensive resorts in the world, along as being a luxury yacht magnet and billionaires' playground.

History
The village itself was designed in the 1950–1960s by architects and landscape designers such as Jacques Couelle, Luigi Vietti and Michele Busiri Vici.

Geography
Porto Cervo lies in the northeastern corner of Sardinia, by the Tyrrhenian Coast, some km south of La Maddalena island.

The Port
Porto Cervo has a well-equipped marina consisting of two ports: The Old Port (Porto Vecchio) and the Modern Marina. 

The Porto Vecchio (old port) in the village of Porto Cervo and it was built in the 1960s as a fishing port. The modern marina lies to the west surrounded by the facilities of the marina village. 

Porto Cervo Marina has 700 berths, with 100 slips reserved for megayachts, and accepts reservations.

Tourism

The village is located at the southern and eastern shore of the natural port, where there are shops, a newsagent, bars, restaurants and supermarkets. The other shores of the bay boast the old and the new marina. At the later is the club house of the exclusive Yacht Club Costa Smeralda. The end of the new marina holds a shipyard capable of repairing large luxury yachts.

In a study released by the European luxury real estate brokerage, Romazzino Bay in Porto Cervo is the most expensive location in Europe. House prices reach up to 300,000 euros per square meter.

In 2011 Costa Smeralda had the second, the 4th and the 6th most expensive hotels in the world, the Pitrizza, the Romazzino and the Cala di Volpe Hotel. In 2012 the Hotel Cala di Volpe, which is featured in the 1977 James Bond film The Spy Who Loved Me is listed at number 7 on World's 15 most expensive hotel suites compiled by CNN Go in 2012.

References

External links 

 Official website of the Consorzio Costa Smeralda
 Official website of the Marina di Porto Cervo
 New York Times article about Costa Smeralda and Porto Cervo

Frazioni of the Province of Sassari
Seaside resorts in Italy
1962 establishments in Italy
Populated places established in 1962